HMS Kenilworth Castle was a  of the Royal Navy.

History
She was built by Smiths Dock Company at South Bank, North Yorkshire, launched on 17 August 1943, and commissioned on 14 November 1943.

In World War II, she served as a convoy escort and took part in the sinking of two U-boats:

Kenilworth Castle was scrapped at Llanelli in June 1956. Her bell was given to The Bugle Inn, Yarmouth, Isle of Wight.

In media
Lt. Cmdr. James Joseph Allon (1 May 1910 – 31 May 2004) commanded Kenilworth Castle in the Second World War. Shortly before he died, he wrote some reminiscences of his Merchant Navy and Royal Navy career which are included in the BBC's online archive WW2 People's War here:

References

Publications
 

 

1943 ships
Castle-class corvettes
Ships built on the River Tees